Joseph Weber (1919–2000) was an American physicist.

Josef, Jozef, Joseph or Joe Weber may also refer to:

Joe Weber (baseball) (1862–1921), Canadian outfielder
Joseph N. Weber (1865–1950), Hungarian-born American labor union leader
Joe Weber (vaudevillian) (1867–1942), American comedian
Josef Weber (1898–1970), German footballer
Josef Weber (1908–1985), German peace activist, recipient of 1983–84 Lenin Peace Prize
Gerald Joseph Weber (1914–1989), American judge
Joseph 'Jup' Weber (born 1950), Luxembourgian Green and Liberal politician
Jozef Weber (born 1970), Czech footballer

Characters 
Josef Weber, key persona in 2013's The Storyteller (Picoult novel)

See also
Joe Webber (born 1993), New Zealand rugby player